Stephen Louis Dalkowski Jr. (June 3, 1939 – April 19, 2020), nicknamed Dalko, was an American left-handed pitcher. He was sometimes called the fastest pitcher in baseball history and had a fastball that probably exceeded . As no radar gun or other device was available at games to measure the speed of his pitches precisely, the actual top speed of his pitches remains unknown. Regardless of its actual speed, his fastball earned him the nickname "White Lightning". Such was his reputation that despite his never reaching the major leagues, and finishing his minor league years in class-B ball, the 1966 Sporting News item about the end of his career was headlined "Living Legend Released."

Dalkowski was also famous for his unpredictable performance and inability to control his pitches. His alcoholism and violent behavior off the field caused him problems during his career and after his retirement. After he retired from baseball, he spent many years as an alcoholic, making a meager living as a manual laborer. He recovered in the 1990s, but his alcoholism left him with dementia and he had difficulty remembering his life after the mid-1960s.

Screenwriter and film director Ron Shelton played in the Baltimore Orioles minor league organization soon after Dalkowski. His 1988 film Bull Durham features a character named Ebby Calvin "Nuke" LaLoosh (played by Tim Robbins) who is based loosely on the tales Shelton was told about Dalkowski. Brendan Fraser's character in the film The Scout is loosely based on him. In 1970, Sports Illustrated'''s Pat Jordan wrote, "Inevitably, the stories outgrew the man, until it was no longer possible to distinguish fact from fiction. But, no matter how embellished, one fact always remained: Dalkowski struck out more batters and walked more batters per nine-inning game than any professional pitcher in baseball history."

Baseball career

Dalkowski was born in New Britain, Connecticut, the son of Adele Zaleski, who worked in a ball bearing factory, and Stephen Dalkowski, a tool and die maker. He began playing baseball in high school, and also played football as a quarterback for New Britain High School. During his time with the football team, they won the division championship twice, in 1955 and 1956. However, he excelled the most in baseball, and still holds a Connecticut state record for striking out 24 batters in a single game.

After graduating from high school in 1957, Dalkowski signed with the Baltimore Orioles for a $4,000 signing bonus, and initially played for their class-D minor league affiliate in Kingsport, Tennessee. He spent his entire career in the minor leagues, playing in nine different leagues during his nine-year career. His only appearance at the Orioles' Memorial Stadium was during an exhibition game in 1959, when he struck out the opposing side.

Dalkowski's claim to fame was the high velocity of his fastball. Accurate measurements at the time were difficult to make, but the consensus is that Dalkowski regularly threw well above . Dalkowski's raw speed was aided by his highly flexible left (pitching) arm, and by his unusual "buggy-whip" pitching motion, which ended in a cross-body arm swing. "I hit my left elbow on my right knee so often, they finally made me a pad to wear", recalled Dalkowski.

Dalkowski often had extreme difficulty controlling his pitches. He often walked more batters than he struck out, and many times his pitches would go wild — sometimes so wild that they ended up in the stands. Batters found the combination of extreme velocity and lack of control intimidating. Oriole Paul Blair stated that "He threw the hardest I ever saw. He was the wildest I ever saw".

During a typical season in 1960, while pitching in the California League, Dalkowski struck out 262 batters and walked 262 in 170 innings. Dalkowski for 1960 thus figures at both 13.81 K/9IP and 13.81 BB/9IP (see lifetime statistics below). In comparison, Randy Johnson currently holds the major league record for strikeouts per nine innings in a season with 13.41. In separate games, Dalkowski struck out 21 batters, and walked 21 batters.

Because a pitcher is generally considered wild if he averages four walks per nine innings, a pitcher of average repertoire who consistently walked as many as nine men per nine innings would not normally be considered a prospect. But such was the allure of Dalkowski's explosive arm that the Orioles gave him chance after chance to harness his "stuff", knowing that if he ever managed to control it, he would be a great weapon.

Pitching for the Kingsport (Tennessee) Orioles on August 31, 1957, in Bluefield, West Virginia, Dalkowski struck out 24 Bluefield hitters in a single minor league game, yet issued 18 walks, and threw six wild pitches. Dalkowski pitched a total of 62 innings in 1957, struck out 121 (averaging 18 strikeouts per game), but won only once because he walked 129 and threw 39 wild pitches. Moving to the Northern League in 1958–59, he threw a one-hitter but lost 9–8 on the strength of 17 walks. In 1957–58, Dalkowski either struck out or walked almost three out of every four batters he faced.

During the 1960s under Earl Weaver, then the manager for the Orioles' double-A affiliate in Elmira, New York, Dalkowski's game began to show improvement. Weaver had given all of the players an IQ test and discovered that Dalkowski had a lower than normal IQ. Weaver believed that Dalkowski had experienced such difficulty keeping his game under control because he did not have the mental capacity. Weaver kept things simple for Dalkowski, telling him to only throw the fastball and a slider, and to just aim the fastball down the middle of the plate. This allowed Dalkowski to concentrate on just throwing the ball for strikes. Weaver knew that Dalkowski's fastball was practically unhittable no matter where it was in the strike zone, and if Dalkowski missed his target, he might end up throwing it on the corners for a strike anyway. Under Weaver's stewardship, Dalkowski had his best season in 1962, posting personal bests in complete games and earned run average (ERA), and walking less than a batter an inning for the first time in his career. In an extra-inning game, Dalkowski recorded 27 strikeouts (while walking 16 and throwing 283 pitches).

Dalkowski was invited to major league spring training in 1963, and the Orioles expected to call him up to the majors. On March 23, Dalkowski was used as a relief pitcher during a game against the New York Yankees. Most sources say that while throwing a slider to Phil Linz, he felt something pop in his left elbow, which turned out to be a severe muscle strain. Some uncertainty over the cause of his injury exists, however, with other sources contending that he damaged his elbow while throwing to first after fielding a bunt from Yankees pitcher Jim Bouton. Either way, his arm never fully recovered.

He played for two more seasons with the Pittsburgh Pirates and Los Angeles Angels organizations before returning briefly to the Orioles farm system but was unable to regain his form before retiring in 1966.

Dalkowski had a lifetime win–loss record of 46–80 and an ERA of 5.57 in nine minor league seasons, striking out 1,396 and walking 1,354 in 995 innings.

Pitching speed
Dalkowski's wildness frightened even the bravest of hitters. Ted Williams faced Dalkowski once in a spring training game. "Fastest ever", said Williams. "I never want to face him again." Longtime umpire Doug Harvey also cited Dalkowski as the fastest pitcher he had seen: "Nobody could bring it like he could."

Estimates of Dalkowski's top pitching speed abound. Radar guns, which were used for many years in professional baseball, did not exist when Dalkowski was playing, so the only evidence supporting this level of velocity is anecdotal. It is certain that with his high speed and penchant for throwing wild pitches, he would have been an intimidating opponent for any batter who faced him. Andy Etchebarren, a catcher for Dalkowski at Elmira, described his fastball as "light" and fairly easy to catch. According to Etchebarren his wilder pitches usually went high, sometimes low; "Dalkowski would throw a fastball that looked like it was coming in at knee level, only to see it sail past the batter's eyes".

Dalkowski's greatest legacy may be the number of anecdotes (some more believable than others) surrounding his pitching ability. He was said to have thrown a pitch that tore off part of a batter's ear. Some observers believed that this incident made Dalkowski even more nervous and contributed further to his wildness. Another story says that in 1960 at Stockton, California, he threw a pitch that broke umpire Doug Harvey's mask in three places, knocking him  back and sending him to a hospital for three days with a concussion. Dalkowski once won a $5 bet with teammate Herm Starrette who said that he could not throw a baseball through a wall. His first pitch went right through the boards.

The only recorded evidence of his pitching speed stems from 1958, when Dalkowski was sent by the Orioles to Aberdeen Proving Ground, a military installation. However, several factors worked against Dalkowski: he had pitched a game the day before, he was throwing from a flat surface instead of from a pitcher's mound, and he had to throw pitches for 40 minutes at a small target before the machine could capture an accurate measurement. Further, the device measured speed from a few feet away from the plate, instead of 10 feet from release as in modern times.

Earl Weaver, who had years of exposure to both pitchers, said, "[Dalkowski] threw a lot faster than Ryan." , Guinness lists Chapman as the current record holder.

Scientists contend that the theoretical maximum speed that a pitcher can throw is slightly above . Beyond that the pitcher would cause himself a serious injury.

Life after baseball
In 1965, Dalkowski married schoolteacher Linda Moore in Bakersfield, but they divorced two years later. Unable to find any gainful employment, he became a migrant worker. Dalkowski experienced problems with alcohol abuse. He drank heavily as a player and his drinking escalated after the end of his career. He received help from the Association of Professional Ball Players of America (APBPA) periodically from 1974 to 1992 and went through rehabilitation. He was able to find a job and stay sober for several months but soon went back to drinking. The APBPA stopped providing financial assistance to him because he was using the funds to purchase alcohol.

Poor health in the 1980s prevented Dalkowski from working altogether, and by the end of the decade he was living in a small apartment in California, penniless and suffering from alcohol-induced dementia. At some point during this time, Dalkowski married a motel clerk named Virginia, who moved him to Oklahoma City in 1993. She died of a brain aneurysm in 1994. Dalkowski had lived at a long-term care facility in New Britain for several years. In a 2003 interview, Dalkowski said that he was unable to remember life events that occurred from 1964 to 1994.

For his contributions to baseball lore, Dalkowski was inducted into the Shrine of the Eternals on July 19, 2009. Sports Illustrated's 1970 profile of Dalkowski concluded, "His failure was not one of deficiency, but rather of excess. He was too fast. His ball moved too much. His talent was too superhuman... It mattered only that once, just once, Steve Dalkowski threw a fastball so hard that Ted Williams never even saw it. No one else could claim that."

Death
With complications from dementia, Steve Dalkowski died from COVID-19 in New Britain, Connecticut, on April 19, 2020. Dalkowski was one of the many nursing home victims that succumbed to the virus during the COVID-19 pandemic in Connecticut.

Notes

References
Online

 Steve Dalkowski Page
 No Crying in Baseball
 The Birdhouse: The Phenom, an interview with Steve Dalkowski in October 2005
 Vecsey, George "A Hall of Fame for a Legendary Fastball Pitcher" The New York Times, Sunday, July 19, 2009
 Posnanski, Joe. "How do you solve a problem like Dalkowski?" NBC Sportsworld (April 2015)

Literary
 Brooks, Ken (1986). That Last Rebel Yell. .
 Eisenberg, John (2001). From 33rd Street to Camden Yards: An Oral History of the Baltimore Orioles. .
 Jordan, Pat (1973). The Suitors of Spring''. .

Personal
 Krieger, Kit: Posting on SABR-L mailing list from 2002. Used with permission. (See talk).
 Beverage, Dick: Secretary-Treasurer for the Association of Professional Ballplayers of America.

1939 births
2020 deaths
American people of Polish descent
Aberdeen Pheasants players
Baseball players from Connecticut
Columbus Jets players
Elmira Pioneers players
Kingsport Mets players
Knoxville Smokies players
Pensacola Dons players
Rochester Red Wings players
San Jose Bees players
Sportspeople from New Britain, Connecticut
Stockton Ports players
Tri-City Atoms players
Wilson Tobs players
Deaths from the COVID-19 pandemic in Connecticut